, also known as Jump Comics, is a line of manga anthologies (manga magazines) created by Shueisha. It began with Shōnen Jump manga anthology in 1968, later renamed Weekly Shōnen Jump. The origin of the name is unknown. The Jump anthologies are primarily intended for teen male audiences, although the Weekly Shōnen Jump magazine has also been popular with the female demographic. Along with the line of manga anthologies, Shōnen Jump also includes a crossover media franchise, where there have been various Shōnen Jump themed crossover anime and video games (since Famicom Jump) which bring together various Shōnen Jump manga characters.

History 
In 1949, Shueisha got into the business of making manga magazines, the first being Omoshiro Book. In 1951, Shueisha created a female version of that anthology entitled Shōjo Book. Shōjo Book led to the publication of the highly successful Shōjo manga magazine: Ribon. Omoshiro Book went out of print and Shueisha decided to make another male version of their successful Shōjo Book to even it out and made the magazine Shōnen Book. In the middle of Shōnen Book's publication, Shōnen Jump began its run (at the time was a Semiweekly magazine and had no "Weekly"). Shōnen Book ended when Shōnen Jump became a Weekly magazine correctly changing its name to Weekly Shōnen Jump. In 1969 a special issue called Bessatsu Shōnen Jump took Shōnen Book's place. In addition to the success of Weekly Shōnen Jump, Shueisha created a Seinen version of the magazine in 1979, called Young Jump (now Weekly Young Jump). Bessatsu Shōnen Jump, later got renamed Monthly Shōnen Jump and became a magazine of its own. The seasonal issues of Weekly Shōnen Jump are now called Akamaru Jump. In 1985, Shueisha started the publication of two business related manga magazines; a salaryman Jump magazine called Business Jump and an office lady manga magazine called Office You, also in 1988 started the publication of Super Jump. Many other Seinen related Jump magazines, started as spin-off issues of the Weekly Young Jump magazine. In 1993, Shueisha announced and released the video game/manga magazine V Jump alongside the Jump light novel line Jump j-Books. In 2003 Shogakukan's Viz Media released an English version of Weekly Shōnen Jump called Shonen Jump. Monthly Shōnen Jump discontinued in 2007 and was replaced with the Jump SQ. magazine, four series from the magazine were moved. In addition to the Jump SQ. anthology, a spin-off issue was created, called Jump SQ.II (Second). Saikyō Jump was started on December 3, 2010, with close ties to Weekly Shōnen Jump and V Jump.

Jump magazines 
Green titles in sub-magazines have only been published once.
See Shōnen manga and Seinen manga for details of classification.

Shōnen

Seinen

International

Shonen Jump (Viz Media, 20022012)
Weekly Shonen Jump (Viz Media, 20122018)
Banzai!
Formosa Youth

Imprints 
When the chapters of a manga series originally serialized in a Jump magazine are collected and published into tankōbon form, they are given different imprints depending on its original magazine or type of tankōbon.

Jump Comics 
, abbreviated JC, is the most common imprint used for tankōbon editions of manga series serialized in Weekly Shōnen Jump and other Jump magazines. The Jump Comics line is published in English by Viz Media under the names Shonen Jump and Shonen Jump Advanced. Shōnen Jump Advanced was created for the distribution of manga series considered more mature due to content or themes. Series released under SJA include Eyeshield 21, Ichigo 100%, Pretty Face, I"s, Hunter × Hunter, Bobobo-bo Bo-bobo and Death Note.

Jump Comics+ is the tankōbon imprint for manga series originally released digitally-only on the Shōnen Jump+ app and website.  is an aizōban imprint formerly run by Weekly Shōnen Jump. The seinen manga anthology Super Jump has taken hold of the line and publishes their manga under it. These manga volumes have expensive paper and new cover artwork. The Jump Comics Deluxe edition of Rurouni Kenshin has been released in English by Viz under the title Rurouni Kenshin VIZBIG Edition.

Jump Comics Digital is an additional imprint added to manga from any Jump magazine when it is published digitally. Jump Comics SQ. is the imprint for manga series originally run in the Jump Square magazine.  was the imprint for manga originally serialized in the V Jump magazine, but they now use the Jump Comics imprint instead.  is the imprint for series originally run in the seinen manga magazines Weekly Young Jump, Business Jump and Ultra Jump.

Jump J-Books 
, commonly referred to as J-Books, is a line of light novels and guidebooks run by Weekly Shōnen Jump. J-Books has run almost ever since the manga Dr. Slump appeared in the 80's, the line is still running and had many series adapted for novels. Jump J-Book have been published in English by Viz Media under the name SJ Fiction.

 Shueisha Comic Bunko 
 is a bunkoban imprint run by Weekly Shōnen Jump. Bunkoban editions have different cover artwork and different cheaper paper.

 Shueisha Jump Remix 
, abbreviated as SJR, is a line of large square-bound phone book size issues of early Jump Comics series. They often include special features like original artwork and info. Shueisha Jump Remix is an arm of Shueisha Remix; other types Shueisha REMIX's exist like Shueisha Girl's Remix and Shueisha Home Remix

 Jump related locations and expos 

 Jump Festa 

 is a manga and anime exposition held every year by Shueisha. It focuses on all of the publisher's shōnen-related Jump magazines: Weekly Shōnen Jump, V Jump, Jump SQ., Saikyō Jump, and formerly featured Monthly Shōnen Jump. Also the video game company, Square Enix promotes their games at Jump Festa, due to their close ties with the V Jump magazine.

 Video games 
The Jump media franchise includes the following video games, published by Bandai and Bandai Namco Entertainment:Famicom Jump: Hero Retsuden (1988)Famicom Jump II: Saikyō no Shichinin (1991)Battle Stadium D.O.N (2006)Jump Super Stars (2005)Jump Ultimate Stars (2006)J-Stars Victory VS (2014)
Famicom Mini: 50th Anniversary Shōnen Jump Edition (2018)Jump Force (2019)

 See also Shōnen Jump+ — webcomic platform which hosts a digital version of Weekly Shōnen Jump'' and original manga; despite its name it also hosts female and adult-oriented manga
List of series run in Weekly Shōnen Jump
List of best-selling manga
List of best-selling comic series
List of the highest-grossing media franchises

References

External links
 Official Shueisha history page

Shueisha magazines
Shueisha franchises
Manga magazines published in Japan